Stars and bars may refer to:

 Stars and Bars (flag), the first (1861–1863) flag of the Confederate States of America
 Stars and Bars (1988 film), 1988 comedy starring Daniel Day-Lewis
 Stars and Bars (1917 film), 1917 silent film comedy directed by Victor Heerman
 Stars and bars (combinatorics), a graphical method used to derive the formula for multiset coefficients and other combinatorial theorems
 Stars and Bars (novel), a 1984 novel by William Boyd
 A song by Scottish group Goodbye Mr. Mackenzie

See also
Stars and stripes (disambiguation)
Stars (disambiguation)
Stripes (disambiguation)